The 1911 Navy Midshipmen football team represented the United States Naval Academy during the 1911 college football season. The team compiled an undefeated 6–0–3 record, shut out seven opponents, and defeated its opponents by a combined score of 116 to 11.

The annual Army–Navy Game was played on November 25 at Franklin Field in Philadelphia. For the second consecutive year, the game was a low-scoring affair; Navy won  on a field goal by Jack Dalton.

Fullback Jack Dalton was the team captain and was a consensus first-team selection for the All-America team. Three other Navy player received first-team honors from one or more selectors: tackle John Brown received first-team honors from Ted Coy; guard Ray Wakeman received first-team honors from Henry L. Williams; and guard George Howe received first-team honors from The New York Globe. Brown and Dalton were both later inducted into the College Football Hall of Fame.

Schedule

References

Navy
Navy Midshipmen football seasons
College football undefeated seasons
Navy Midshipmen football